The Federal Bureau of Prisons classifies prisons into seven categories:

 United States penitentiaries
 Federal correctional institutions
 Private correctional institutions
 Federal prison camps
 Administrative facilities
 Federal correctional complexes
Former Federal facilities

This list does not include military prisons, halfway houses, or prisons, jails, and other facilities operated by state or local governments that contract with the Federal Bureau of Prisons. It also does not include facilities operated by Immigration and Customs Enforcement (ICE).

United States penitentiaries 
Most United States penitentiaries (USPs) are high-security facilities, which have highly secured perimeters with walls or reinforced fences, multiple and single-occupant cell housing, the highest staff-to-inmate ratio, and close control of inmate movement. The most restrictive facility in the federal prison system is USP Florence ADMAX, the federal supermax prison, which holds inmates who are considered the most dangerous and in need of the tightest controls. USP Leavenworth, USP Lewisburg, USP Lompoc, and USP Marion are medium-security facilities. USP Atlanta is a low security facility with the primary purpose of holding inmates until they are transferred to other institutions. USP Marion contains a highly restrictive communication management unit, which holds inmates under stricter controls. Many USPs include minimum-security satellite camps on the same property and under the same administration as the higher-security units.

Federal correctional institutions 
Federal correctional institutions (FCIs) are medium- and low-security facilities, which have strengthened perimeters (often double fences with electronic detection systems), mostly cell-type housing, a wide variety of work and treatment programs, and a higher staff-to-inmate ratio and greater internal controls than low-security FCIs. FCI Terre Haute contains a more restrictive section designated as a communication management unit for inmates considered high-security risks.

Private correctional institutions 
In August 2016, Justice Department officials announced that the FBOP would be phasing out its use of contracted facilities, on the grounds that private prisons provide less safe and less effective services with no substantial cost savings. However, under the Trump administration in 2017, the Justice Department rescinded this phaseout, stating that it would re-implement its usage of private correctional facilities.

Most of these institutions are operated by the GEO Group, Inc., exceptions being Giles W. Dalby Correctional Institution, operated by Management and Training Corporation, and McRae Correctional Institution, operated by CoreCivic.

Federal prison camps
Federal prison camps (FPCs) are minimum-security facilities, which have dormitory housing, a relatively low staff-to-inmate ratio, and limited or no perimeter fencing. These institutions are work- and program-oriented. Many are located adjacent to larger institutions or on military bases, where inmates help serve the labor needs of the larger institution or base.

Administrative facilities
Administrative facilities are institutions with special missions, such as the detention of pretrial offenders; the treatment of inmates with serious or chronic medical problems; or the containment of extremely dangerous, violent, or escape-prone inmates. Administrative facilities include metropolitan correctional centers (MCCs), metropolitan detention centers (MDCs), federal detention centers (FDCs), federal medical centers (FMCs), the Federal Transfer Center (FTC), and the Medical Center for Federal Prisoners (MCFP), all of which are capable of holding inmates in all security categories.

Former federal facilities
This list enumerates facilities that were formerly owned by the Federal Bureau of Prisons.

See also

 Incarceration in the United States
 List of detention sites in the United States

References 

.
Fed